Lövåsvallen  is a football stadium in Billingsfors, Sweden  and the home stadium for the football team Billingsfors IK.

References 

Football venues in Sweden